Military history is the study of armed conflict in the history of humanity, and its impact on the societies, cultures and economies thereof, as well as the resulting changes to local and international relationships.

Professional historians normally focus on military affairs that had a major impact on the societies involved as well as the aftermath of conflicts, while amateur historians and hobbyists often take a larger interest in the details of battles, equipment and uniforms in use.

The essential subjects of military history study are the causes of war, the social and cultural foundations, military doctrine on each side, the logistics, leadership, technology, strategy, and tactics used, and how these changed over time. On the other hand, just war theory explores the moral dimensions of warfare, and to better limit the destructive reality caused by war, seeks to establish a doctrine of military ethics.

As an applied field, military history has been studied at academies and service schools because the military command seeks to not repeat past mistakes, and improve upon its current performance by instilling an ability in commanders to perceive historical parallels during a battle, so as to capitalize on the lessons learned from the past. When certifying military history instructors the Combat Studies Institute deemphasizes rote detail memorization and focuses on themes and context in relation to current and future conflict, using the motto "Past is Prologue."

The discipline of military history is dynamic, changing with development as much of the subject area as the societies and organisations that make use of it. The dynamic nature of the discipline of military history is largely related to the rapidity of change the military forces, and the art and science of managing them, as well as the frenetic pace of technological development that had taken place during the period known as the Industrial Revolution, and more recently in the nuclear and information ages. An important recent concept is the Revolution in Military Affairs (RMA) which attempts to explain how warfare has been shaped by emerging technologies, such as gunpowder. It highlights the short outbursts of rapid change followed by periods of relative stability.

Popular versus academic military history
In terms of the history profession in major countries, military history is an orphan, despite its enormous popularity with the general public. William H. McNeill points out:
This branch of our discipline flourishes in an intellectual ghetto. The 144 books in question [published in 1968-78] fall into two distinct classes: works aimed at a popular readership, written by journalists and men of letters outside academic circles, and professional work nearly always produced within the military establishment.... The study of military history in universities remains seriously underdeveloped. Indeed, lack of interest in and disdain for military history probably constitute one of the strangest prejudices of the profession.

In recent decades University level courses in military history remain popular; often they use films to humanize the combat experience. For example, Eugene P. A. Scleh, history professor at the University of Maine, has explored the advantages and problems of teaching a course of "Modern War and Its Images" entirely through films. Students said they found the documentaries more valuable than the dramas. However, military historians are frustrated by their marginal status in major history departments.

Historiography of military history
Historiography is the study of the history and method of the discipline of history or the study of a specialised topic. In this case, military history with an eye to gaining an accurate assessment of conflicts using all available sources. For this reason military history is periodised, creating overlaying boundaries of study and analysis in which descriptions of battles by leaders may be unreliable due to the inclination to minimize mention of failure and exaggerate success. Military historians use Historiographical analysis in an effort to allow an unbiased, contemporary view of records.

One military historian, Jeremy Black, outlined problems 21st-century military historians face as an inheritance of their predecessors: Eurocentricity, a technological bias, a focus on leading military powers and dominant military systems, the separation of land from sea and recently air conflicts, the focus on state-to-state conflict, a lack of focus on political "tasking" in how forces are used.

If these challenges were not sufficient for the military historians, the limits of method are complicated by the lack of records, either destroyed or never recorded for its value as a military secret that may prevent some salient facts from being reported at all; scholars still do not know the exact nature of Greek fire for instance. Researching Operation Enduring Freedom and Operation Iraqi Freedom, for example, have presented unique challenges to historians due to records that were destroyed to protect classified military information, among other reasons. Historians use their knowledge of government regulation and military organization, and employing a targeted and systematic research strategy to piece together war histories. Despite these limits, wars are some of the most studied and detailed periods of human history.

Military historians have often compared organization, tactical and strategic ideas, leadership, and national support of the militaries of different nations.

In the early 1980s, historian Jeffrey Kimball studied the influence of a historian's political position on current events on interpretive disagreement regarding the causes of 20th century wars. He surveyed the ideological preferences of 109 active diplomatic historians in the United States as well as 54 active military historians. He finds that their current political views are moderately correlated with their historiographical interpretations. A clear position on the left-right continuum regarding capitalism was apparent in most cases. All groups agreed with the proposition, "historically, Americans have tended to view questions of their national security in terms of such extremes as good vs. evil." Though the Socialists were split, the other groups agreed that "miscalculation and/or misunderstanding of the situation" had caused U.S. interventionism." Kimball reports that:
Of historians in the field of diplomatic history, 7% are Socialist, 19% are Other, 53% are Liberal, 11% are None and 10% Conservative. Of military historians, 0% are Socialist, 8% are Other, 35% are Liberal, 18% are None and 40% are Conservative.

Online resources
People interested in military history from all periods of time, and all subtopics, are increasingly turning to the Internet for many more resources than are typically available in nearby libraries. Since 1993, one of the most popular sites, with over 4000 members (subscriptions are free) has been H-WAR, sponsored by the H-Net network based at Michigan State University. H-War has six coeditors, and an academic advisory board that sets policy. It sponsors daily moderated discussions of current topics, announcements of new publications and conferences, and reports on developments at conferences. The H-Net family of lists has sponsored and published over 46,000 scholarly book reviews, thousands of which deal with books in military history broadly conceived. Wikipedia itself has a very wide coverage of military history, with over 180,000 articles. Its editors sponsor Wikipedia:WikiProject Military history and encourage readers to join.

Military and war museums 

Military museums specialize in military histories; they are often organized from a national point of view, where a museum in a particular country will have displays organized around conflicts in which that country has taken part. They typically take a broad view of warfare's role in the nation's history. They typically include displays of weapons and other military equipment, uniforms, wartime propaganda, and exhibits on civilian life during wartime, and decorations, among others. A military museum may be dedicated to a particular or area, such as the Imperial War Museum Duxford for military aircraft, Deutsches Panzermuseum for tanks, the Lange Max Museum for the Western Front (World War I), the International Spy Museum for espionage, The National World War I Museum for World War I, the "D-Day Paratroopers Historical Center" (Normandy) for WWII airborne, or more generalist, such as the Canadian War Museum or the Musée de l'Armée. For the Italian alpine wall one can find the most popular museum of bunkers in the small museum n8bunker at Olang / Kronplatz in the heard of the dolomites of South Tyrol. The U.S. Army and the state National Guards operate 98 military history museums across the United States and three abroad.

Curators debate how or whether the goal of providing diverse representations of war, in terms of positive and negative aspects of warfare. War is seldom presented as a good thing, but soldiers are heavily praised. David Lowenthal has observed that in today's museums, "nothing seems too horrendous to commemorate". Yet as Andrew Whitmarsh notes, "museums frequently portray a sanitised version of warfare." The actual bomber that dropped the atomic bomb on Japan became the focus of an angry national controversy with veterans attacking curators and historians when the Smithsonian Institution planned to put its fuselage on public display in 1995. The uproar led to cancellation of the exhibit.

Early historians
The documentation of military history begins with the confrontation between Sumer (current Iraq) and Elam (current Iran) c. 2700 BC near the modern Basra. Other prominent records in military history are the Trojan War in Homer's Iliad (though its historicity has been challenged), The Histories by Herodotus (484 BC – 425 BC) who is often called the "father of history". Next was Thucydides whose impartiality, despite being an Athenian, allowed him to take advantage of his exile to research the war from different perspectives by carefully examining documents and interviewing eyewitnesses. An approach centered on the analysis of a leader was taken by Xenophon (430 BC – 355 BC) in Anabasis, recording the expedition of Cyrus the Younger into Anatolia.

The records of the Roman Julius Caesar (100 BC – 44 BC) enable a comparative approach for campaigns such as Commentarii de Bello Gallico and Commentarii de Bello Civili.

Technological evolution

New weapons development can dramatically alter the face of war, the cost of warfare, the preparations, and the training of soldiers and leaders. A rule of thumb is that if your enemy has a potentially war winning weapon, you have to either match it or neutralize it.

Ancient era
Chariots originated around 2000 BC. The chariot was an effective, fast weapon; while one man controlled the maneuvering of the chariot, a second bowman could shoot arrows at enemy soldiers. These became crucial to the maintenance of several governments, including the New Egyptian Kingdom and the Shang dynasty and the nation states of the early to middle Zhou dynasty.

Some of the military unit types and technologies which were developed in the ancient world are:
 Slinger
 Hoplite
 Auxiliaries
 Infantry
 Archery
 Chariots
 Cavalry

For settled agrarian civilizations, the infantry became the core of military action. The infantry started as opposing armed groups of soldiers underneath commanders. The Greeks and early Romans used rigid, heavily armed phalanxes. The Macedonians and Hellenistic states would adopt phalanx formations with sarissa pikemen. The Romans would later adopt more flexible maniples from their neighbors which made them extremely successful in the field of battle. The kingdoms of the Warring States in East Asia also adopted infantry combat, a transition from chariot warfare from centuries earlier.

Archers were a major component of many ancient armies, notably those of the Persians, Scythians, Egyptians, Nubians, Indians, Koreans, Chinese, and Japanese.

Cavalry became an important tool. In the Sicilian Expedition, led by Athens in an attempt to subdue Syracuse, the well-trained Syracusan cavalry became crucial to the success of the Syracusans. Macedonian Alexander the Great effectively deployed his cavalry forces to secure victories. In battles such as the Battle of Cannae of the Second Punic War, and the Battle of Carrhae of the Roman-Persian Wars, the importance of the cavalry would be repeated.

There were also horse archers, who had the ability to shoot on horseback – the Parthians, Scythians, Mongols, and other various steppe people were especially fearsome with this tactic. By the 3rd–4th century AD, heavily armored cavalry became widely adopted by the Parthians, Sasanians, Byzantines, Eastern Han dynasty and Three Kingdoms, etc.

The early Indo-Iranians developed the use of chariots in warfare. The scythed chariot was later invented in India and soon adopted by the Persians.

War elephants were sometimes deployed for fighting in ancient warfare. They were first used in India and later adopted by the Persians. War elephants were also used in the Battle of the Hydaspes River, and by Hannibal in the Second Punic War against the Romans. One of the most important military transactions of the ancient world was Chandragupta Maurya's gift of 500 elephants to Seleucus I Nicator.

Naval warfare was often crucial to military success. Early navies used sailing ships without cannons; often the goal was to ram the enemy ships and cause them to sink. There was human oar power, often using slaves, built up to ramming speed. Galleys were used in the 3rd millennium BC by the Cretans. The Greeks later advanced these ships.

In 1210 BC, the first recorded naval battle was fought between Suppiluliuma II, king of the Hittites, and Cyprus, which was defeated. In the Greco-Persian Wars, the navy became of increasing importance.

Triremes were involved in more complicated sea-land operations. Themistocles helped to build up a stronger Greek navy, composed of 310 ships, and defeated the Persians at the Battle of Salamis, ending the Persian invasion of Greece.

In the First Punic War, the war between Carthage and Rome started with an advantage to Carthage because of their naval experience. A Roman fleet was built in 261 BC, with the addition of the corvus that allowed Roman soldiers to board enemy ships. The bridge would prove effective at the Battle of Mylae, resulting in a Roman victory.

The Vikings, in the 8th century AD, invented a ship propelled by oars with a dragon decorating the prow, hence called the Drakkar. The 12th century AD Song Dynasty invented ships with watertight bulkhead compartments while the 2nd century BC Han dynasty invented rudders and sculled oars for their warships.

Fortifications are important in warfare. Early hill-forts were used to protect inhabitants in the Iron Age. They were primitive forts surrounded by ditches filled with water. Forts were then built out of mud bricks, stones, wood, and other available materials. Romans used rectangular fortresses built out of wood and stone. As long as there have been fortifications, there have been contraptions to break in, dating back to the times of Romans and earlier. Siege warfare is often necessary to capture forts.

Middle-ages

Some of the military unit types and technologies which were used in the medieval period are:
 Artillery
 Cataphract
 Condottieri
 Fyrd
 Rashidun
 Mobile guard
 Mamluk
 Janissary
 Knight (see also: Chivalry)
 Crossbow
 Pikeman
 Samurai
 Sipahi
 Trebuchet

Bows and arrows were often used by combatants. Egyptians shot arrows from chariots effectively. The crossbow was developed around 500 BC in China, and was used heavily in the Middle Ages. The English/Welsh longbow from the 12th century also became important in the Middle Ages. It helped to give the English a large early advantage in the Hundred Years' War, even though the English were eventually defeated. The Battle of Crécy and the Battle of Agincourt are excellent examples of how to destroy an enemy using a longbow. It dominated battlefields for over a century.

Gunpowder

There is evidence for gunpowder evolving slowly from formulations by Chinese alchemists as early as the 4th century, at first as experiments for life force and metal transmutation, and later experiments as pyrotechnics and incendiaries. By the 10th century, the developments in gunpowder led to many new weapons that were improved over time. The Chinese used incendiary devices based on this in siege warfare against the Mongols starting in the mid 13th century. "Pots with wicks of flax or cotton were used, containing a combination of sulfur, saltpeter (potassium nitrate), aconitine, oil, resin, ground charcoal and wax." Joseph Needham argued the Chinese were able to destroy buildings and walls using such devices. Such experimentation was not present in Western Europe, where the combination of saltpeter, sulfur and charcoal were used exclusively for explosives and as a propellant in firearms. What the Chinese often referred to as the "fire drug" arrived in Europe, fully fleshed out, as gunpowder.

Cannons were first used in Europe in the early 14th century, and played a vital role in the Hundred Years' War. The first cannons were simply welded metal bars in the form of a cylinder, and the first cannonballs were made of stone. By 1346, at the Battle of Crécy, the cannon had been used; at the Battle of Agincourt they would be used again.

The first infantry firearms, from fire lances to hand cannons, were held in one hand, while the explosive charge was ignited by a lit match or hot coal held in the other hand. In the mid-15th century came the matchlock, allowing the gun to be aimed and fired while held steady with both hands, as used in the arquebus. Starting about 1500, clever but complicated firing mechanisms were invented to generate sparks to ignite the powder instead of a lit match, starting with the wheel lock, snaplock, snaphance, and finally the flintlock mechanism, which was simple and reliable, becoming standard with the musket by the early 17th century.

At the beginning of the 16th century, the first European fire ships were used. Ships were filled with flammable materials, set on fire, and sent to enemy lines. This tactic was successfully used by Francis Drake to scatter the Spanish Armada at the Battle of Gravelines, and would later be used by the Chinese, Russians, Greeks, and several other countries in naval battles.

Naval mines were invented in the 17th century, though they were not used in great numbers until the American Civil War. They were used heavily in the First and Second World Wars. Air-deployed naval mines were used to mine the North Vietnamese port of Haiphong during the Vietnam War. The Iraqi Navy of Saddam Hussein used naval mines extensively during the Tanker War, as part of the Iran–Iraq War.

The first navigable submarine was built in 1624 by Cornelius Drebbel, it could cruise at a depth of 15 feet (5 m). However, the first military submarine was constructed in 1885 by Isaac Peral.

The Turtle was developed by David Bushnell during the American Revolution. Robert Fulton then improved the submarine design by creating the Nautilus.

The Howitzer, a type of field artillery, was developed in the 17th century to fire high trajectory explosive shells at targets that could not be reached by flat trajectory projectiles.

Organizational changes resulting in better training and intercommunication, made the concept combined arms possible, allowing the use of infantry, cavalry, and artillery in a coordinated way.

Bayonets also became of wide usage to infantry soldiers. Bayonet is named after Bayonne, France where it was first manufactured in the 16th century. It is used often in infantry charges to fight in hand-to-hand combat. General Jean Martinet introduced the bayonet to the French army. They were used heavily in the American Civil War, and continued to be used in modern wars like the Invasion of Iraq.

Balloons were first used in warfare at the end of the 18th century. It was first introduced in Paris of 1783; the first balloon traveled over 5 miles (8 km). Previously military scouts could only see from high points on the ground, or from the mast of a ship. Now they could be high in the sky, signalling to troops on the ground. This made it much more difficult for troop movements to go unobserved.

At the end of the 18th century, iron-cased artillery rockets were successfully used militarily in India against the British by Tipu Sultan of the Kingdom of Mysore during the Anglo-Mysore Wars. Rockets were generally inaccurate at that time, though William Hale, in 1844, was able to develop a better rocket. The new rocket no longer needed the rocket stick, and had a higher accuracy.

In the 1860s there were a series of advancements in rifles. The first repeating rifle was designed in 1860 by a company bought out by Winchester, which made new and improved versions. Springfield rifles arrived in the mid-19th century also. Machine guns arrived in the late 19th century. Automatic rifles and light machine guns first arrived at the beginning of the 20th century.

In the later part of the 19th century, the self-propelled torpedo was developed. The HNoMS Rap was the world's first torpedo boat.

Early guns and artillery 

The fire lance, the predecessor of the gun, was invented in China between the tenth and eleventh century. The barrel was originally designed out of bamboo shoots, later with metal. Joseph Needham notes "all the long preparations and tentative experiments were made in China, and everything came to Islam and the West fully fledged, whether it was the fire lance or the explosive bomb, the rocket or the metal-barrel handgun and bombard." By the 1320s Europe had guns, but scholars state that the exact time and method of migration from China remains a mystery. Evidence of firearms is found in Iran and Central Asia in the late fourteenth century. It was not until roughly 1442 that guns were referenced in India. Reliable references to guns in Russia begins around 1382.

An illustration of a "pot-shaped gun" found in the Holkham Hall Milemete manuscript dated to 1326 shows earliest advent of firearms in European history. The illustration shows an arrow, set in the pot-shaped gun pointed directly at a structure. Archaeological evidence of such "gun arrows" were discovered in Eltz Castle, "dated by relation to a historical event (a feud with the Archbishop of Trier in 1331-36 leading to a siege), seem to confirm again that this was at least one of the types of guns like the Milemete used in these very early examples."

According to Peter Fraser Purton, the best evidence of the earliest gun in Europe is the Loshult gun, dated to the fourteenth century. Discovered in 1861, the Loshult was made of bronze measured 11.8 inches in length. A replica of the Loshult was created, using similar gunpowder compounds with present-day materials, to determine the effectiveness of the weapon. The Gunpowder Research Group, who designed the recreation, found that at high elevations, the Loshult could fire as far as 1300 meters. Though inaccurate, missing targets further than 200 meters, the Loshult could fire a range of projectiles such as arrows and shot. It was determined that the Loshult could be effectively fired at ranks of soldiers and structures.

Written works from the Cabinet des Titres of the Imperial Library of Paris has found evidence of canons in France in 1338. The works illustrate canons being used on-board ships at the Rouen during that time. "...an iron Fire-arm, which was provided with forty-eight bolts, made of iron and freather; also one pound of saltpetre and half a pound of sulphur to make the powder propel arrows."

Researchers have been unable to determine the sizes of these cannons and others, outside the artifacts recovered. Sir Henry Brackenbury was able to surmise the approximate size of these cannons by comparing receipts for both the firearms and the corresponding amounts of gunpowder purchased. The receipts show a transaction for "25 Livres for 5 canons." Brackenbury was able to deduce, when comparing the costs of the cannons and the gunpowder apportioned, that they each iron cannon weighed approximately 25 lbs, while the brass cannons weighed roughly 22 lbs.

Philip the Bold (1363-1404) is credited with creating the most effective artillery power in Europe in the late fourteenth century, effectively creating the Burgundian estate. Philip's development of a large artillery army made the small country a reputable force against larger empires such as England and France. Philip had achieved this by establishing a large scale artillery manufacturing economy in Burgundy. Philip used his new cache of artillery to help the French capture an English-held fortress of Odruik. The artillery used to take Odruik used cannonballs measuring to about 450 pounds.

Large artillery was a major contributing factor to the fall of Constantinople at the hands of Mehmed the Conqueror (1432-1481). Having resigned his position as ruler due to youth and inexperience in 1446, Mehmed moved to the Ottoman capital of Manisa. After his uncle, Murad II died in 1451, Mehmed once again became Sultan. He turned his attention to claiming the Byzantine capital, Constantinople. Mehmed, like Philip, started mass-producing cannons by enticing craftsmen to his cause with money and freedom. For 55 days, Constantinople was bombarded with artillery fire, throwing cannonballs as large as 800 lbs at its walls. On May 29, 1453, Constantinople fell into Ottoman control.

Early firearm tactics 
As guns and artillery became more advanced and prevalent, so to did the tactics by which they were implemented. According to Historian Michael Roberts "...a military revolution began with the broad adoption of firearms and artillery by late sixteenth-century European armies." Infantry with firearms replaced cavalry. Empires adapted their strongholds to withstand artillery fire. Eventually drilling strategies and battlefield tactics were adapted for the evolution in firearms use.

In Japan, at the same time during the sixteenth-century, this military evolution was also taking hold. These changes included a universal adoption of firearms, tactical developments for effective use, logistical restructuring within the military itself, and "the emergence of centralized and political and institutional relationships indicative of the early modern order."

Tactically, beginning with Oda Nobunaga, the technique known as "volleying" or countermarch drills were implemented. Volley fire is an organized implementation of firearms, where infantry are structured in ranks. The ranks will alternate between loading and firing positions, allowing more consistent rates of fire and preventing enemies from taking over a position while members reload.

Historical evidence shows that Oda Nobunaga implemented his volley technique successfully in 1575, twenty years before evidence of such a technique is shown in Europe. The first indications of the countermarch technique in Europe was by Lord William Louis of Nassau (1538-1574) in the mid-1590s.

Korea also seemed to be adapting the volley technique, earlier than even the Japanese. "Koreans seem to have employed some kind of volley principle with guns by 1447, when the Korean King Sejong the Great instructed his gunners to shoot their 'fire barrels' in squads of five, taking turns firing and loading."

This was on display during what Kenneth Swope called the First Great East Asian War, when Japan was trying to take control and subjugate Korea. Toyotomi Hideyoshi (1537–1598) made a failed invasion of Korea, which lasted six years, eventually pushed back by the Koreans with the aid of Ming China. Japan, using overwhelming firepower, had many early victories on the Korean peninsula's. Though the Korean's had similar manpower, "the curtain of arrows thrown up by defenders was wiped out by (Japanese) gunfire." After the Japanese were finally pushed back in 1598, sweeping military reforms took place in Korea, largely based on updating and implementing the volley technique with firearms.

It was Qi Jiguang, a Ming Chinese General that provided the original treatise, disseminated to Koreans, that aided in this venture. In these manuals, Qi "...gave detailed instructions in the use of small group tactics, psychological warfare, and other 'modern' techniques." Qi emphasized repetitive drilling, dividing men into smaller groups, separating the strong from weak. Qi's ethos was one of synthesizing smaller groups, trained in various tactical formations, into larger companies, battalions and armies. By doing this they could "operate as eyes, hands, and feet..." aiding to overall unit cohesion.

Modern technologies
At the start of the World Wars, various nations had developed weapons that were a surprise to their adversaries, leading to a need to learn from this, and alter how to combat them. Flame throwers were first used in the First World War. The French were the first to introduce the armored car in 1902. Then in 1918, the British produced the first armored troop carrier. Many early tanks were proof of concept but impractical until further development. In World War I, the British and French held a crucial advantage due to their superiority in tanks; the Germans had only a few dozen A7V tanks, as well as 170 captured tanks. The British and French both had several hundred each. The French tanks included the 13 ton Schneider CA1, with a 75 mm gun, and the British had the Mark IV and Mark V tanks.

On December 17, 1903, the Wright Brothers performed the first controlled, powered, heavier-than-air flight; it went 39 meters (120 ft). In 1907, the first helicopter flew, but it wasn't practical for usage. Aviation became important in World War I, in which several aces gained fame. In 1911 an aircraft took off from a warship for the first time. Landings on a cruiser were another matter. This led to the development of an aircraft carrier with a decent unobstructed flight deck.

Chemical warfare exploded into the public consciousness in World War I but may have been used in earlier wars without as much human attention. The Germans used gas-filled shells at the Battle of Bolimov on January 3, 1915. These were not lethal, however. In April 1915, the Germans developed a chlorine gas that was highly lethal, and used it to moderate effect at the Second Battle of Ypres. Gas masks were invented in matter of weeks, and poison gas proved ineffective at winning battles. It was made illegal by all nations in the 1920s.

World War II gave rise to even more technology. The worth of the aircraft carrier was proved in the battles between the United States and Japan like the Battle of Midway. Radar was independently invented by the Allies and Axis powers. It used radio waves to detect objects. Molotov cocktails were invented by General Franco in the Spanish Civil War, directing the Nationalists to use them against Soviet tanks in the assault on Toledo. The atomic bomb was developed by the Manhattan Project and dropped on Hiroshima and Nagasaki in 1945, quickly ending World War II.

During the Cold War, the main powers engaged in a Nuclear arms race. In the space race, both nations attempted to launch human beings into space to the moon. Other technological advances centered on intelligence (like the spy satellite) and missiles (ballistic missiles, cruise missiles). Nuclear submarine, invented in 1955. This meant submarines no longer had to surface as often, and could run more quietly. They evolved into becoming underwater missile platforms.

Periods of military history

Ancient warfare

Much of what we know of ancient history is the history of militaries: their conquests, their movements, and their technological innovations. There are many reasons for this. Kingdoms and empires, the central units of control in the ancient world, could only be maintained through military force. Due to limited agricultural ability, there were relatively few areas that could support large communities, so fighting was common.

Weapons and armor, designed to be sturdy, tended to last longer than other artifacts, and thus a great deal of surviving artifacts recovered tend to fall in this category as they are more likely to survive. Weapons and armor were also mass-produced to a scale that makes them quite plentiful throughout history, and thus more likely to be found in archaeological digs.

Such items were also considered signs of prosperity or virtue, and thus were likely to be placed in tombs and monuments to prominent warriors. And writing, when it existed, was often used for kings to boast of military conquests or victories.

Writing, when used by the common man, also tended to record such events, as major battles and conquests constituted major events that many would have considered worthy of recording either in an epic such as the Homeric writings pertaining to the Trojan War, or even personal writings. Indeed, the earliest stories center on warfare, as war was both a common and dramatic aspect of life; the witnessing of a major battle involving many thousands of soldiers would be quite a spectacle, even today, and thus considered worthy both of being recorded in song and art, but also in realistic histories, as well as being a central element in a fictional work.

Lastly, as nation states evolved and empires grew, the increased need for order and efficiency lead to an increase in the number of records and writings. Officials and armies would have good reason for keeping detailed records and accounts involving any and all things concerning a matter such as warfare that, in the words of Sun Tzu, was "a matter of vital importance to the state". For all these reasons, military history comprises a large part of ancient history.

Notable militaries in the ancient world included the Egyptians, Assyrians, Babylonians, Persians, Ancient Greeks (notably the Spartans and Macedonians), Kushites, Indians (notably the Magadhas, Gangaridais, Gandharas and Cholas), Early Imperial Chinese (notably the Qin and Han Dynasties), Xiongnu Confederation, Ancient Romans, and Carthaginians.

The fertile crescent of Mesopotamia was the center of several prehistoric conquests. Mesopotamia was conquered by the Sumerians, Akkadians, Babylonians, Assyrians and Persians. Iranians were the first nation to introduce cavalry into their army.

Egypt began growing as an ancient power, but eventually fell to the Libyans, Nubians, Assyrians, Persians, Greeks, Romans, Byzantines and Arabs.

The earliest recorded battle in India was the Battle of the Ten Kings. The Indian epics Mahabharata and Ramayana are centered on conflicts and refer to military formations, theories of warfare and esoteric weaponry. Chanakya's Arthashastra contains a detailed study on ancient warfare, including topics on espionage and war elephants.

Alexander the Great invaded Northwestern India and defeated King Porus in the Battle of the Hydaspes River. The same region was soon re conquered by Chandragupta Maurya after defeating the Macedonians and Seleucids. He also went on to conquer the Nanda Empire and unify Northern India. Most of Southern Asia was unified under his grandson Ashoka the Great after the Kalinga War, though the empire collapsed not long after his reign.

In China, the Shang dynasty and Zhou dynasty had risen and collapsed. This led to a Warring States period, in which several states continued to fight with each other over territory. Philosopher-strategists such as Confucius and Sun Tzu wrote various manuscripts on ancient warfare (as well as international diplomacy).

The Warring States era philosopher Mozi (Micius) and his Mohist followers invented various siege weapons and siegecraft, including the Cloud Ladder (a four-wheeled, extendable ramp) to scale fortified walls during a siege of an enemy city. The warring states were first unified by Qin Shi Huang after a series of military conquests, creating the first empire in China.

His empire was succeeded by the Han dynasty, which expanded into Central Asia, Northern China/Manchuria, Southern China, and present day Korea and Vietnam. The Han came into conflict with settled people such as the Wiman Joseon, and proto-Vietnamese Nanyue. They also came into conflict with the Xiongnu (Huns), Yuezhi, and other steppe civilizations.

The Han defeated and drove the Xiongnus west, securing the city-states along the silk route that continued into the Parthian Empire. After the decline of central imperial authority, the Han Dynasty collapsed into an era of civil war and continuous warfare during the Three Kingdoms period in the 3rd century AD.

The Achaemenid Persian Empire was founded by Cyrus the Great after conquering the Median Empire, Neo-Babylonian Empire, Lydia and Asia Minor. His successor Cambyses went on to conquer the Egyptian Empire, much of Central Asia, and parts of Greece, India and Libya. The empire later fell to Alexander the Great after defeating Darius III. After being ruled by the Seleucid dynasty, the Persian Empire was subsequently ruled by the Parthian and Sassanid dynasties, which were the Roman Empire's greatest rivals during the Roman-Persian Wars.

In Greece, several city-states rose to power, including Athens and Sparta. The Greeks successfully stopped two Persian invasions, the first at the Battle of Marathon, where the Persians were led by Darius the Great, and the second at the Battle of Salamis, a naval battle where the Greek ships were deployed by orders of Themistocles and the Persians were under Xerxes I, and the land engagement of the Battle of Plataea.

The Peloponnesian War then erupted between the two Greek powers Athens and Sparta. Athens built a long wall to protect its inhabitants, but the wall helped to facilitate the spread of a plague that killed about 30,000 Athenians, including Pericles. After a disastrous campaign against Syracuse, the Athenian navy was decisively defeated by Lysander at the Battle of Aegospotami.

The Macedonians, underneath Philip II of Macedon and Alexander the Great, invaded Persia and won several major victories, establishing Macedonia as a major power. However, following Alexander's death at an early age, the empire quickly fell apart.

Meanwhile, Rome was gaining power, following a rebellion against the Etruscans. During the three Punic Wars, the Romans defeated the neighboring power of Carthage. The First Punic War centered on naval warfare. The Second Punic War started with Hannibal's invasion of Italy by crossing the Alps. He famously won the encirclement at the Battle of Cannae. However, after Scipio invaded Carthage, Hannibal was forced to follow and was defeated at the Battle of Zama, ending the role of Carthage as a power.

After defeating Carthage the Romans went on to become the Mediterranean's dominant power, successfully campaigning in Greece, (Aemilius Paulus decisive victory over Macedonia at the Battle of Pydna), in the Middle East (Lucius Licinius Lucullus, Gnaeus Pompeius Magnus), in Gaul (Gaius Julius Caesar) and defeating several Germanic tribes (Gaius Marius, Germanicus). While Roman armies suffered several major losses, their large population and ability (and will) to replace battlefield casualties, their training, organization, tactical and technical superiority enabled Rome to stay a predominant military force for several centuries, utilizing well trained and maneuverable armies to routinely overcome the much larger "tribal" armies of their foes (see Battles of Aquae Sextiae, Vercellae, Tigranocerta, Alesia).

In 54 BC the Roman triumvir Marcus Licinius Crassus took the offensive against the Parthian Empire in the east. In a decisive battle at Carrhae Romans were defeated and the golden Aquilae (legionary battle standards) were taken as trophies to Ctesiphon. The battle was one of the worst defeats suffered by the Roman Republic in its entire history.

While successfully dealing with foreign opponents, Rome experienced numerous civil wars, notably the power struggles of Roman generals such as Marius and Sulla during the end of the Republic. Caesar was also notable for his role in the civil war against the other member of the Triumvirate (Pompey) and against the Roman Senate.

The successors of Caesar – Octavian and Mark Anthony, also fought a civil war with Caesar's assassins (Senators Brutus, Cassius, etc.). Octavian and Mark Anthony eventually fought another civil war between themselves to determine the sole ruler of Rome. Octavian emerged victorious and Rome was turned into an empire with a huge standing army of professional soldiers.

By the time of Marcus Aurelius, the Romans had expanded to the Atlantic Ocean in the west and to Mesopotamia in the east and controlled Northern Africa and Central Europe up to the Black Sea. However, Aurelius marked the end of the Five Good Emperors, and Rome quickly fell into decline.

The Huns, Goths, and other barbaric groups invaded Rome, which continued to suffer from inflation and other internal strifes. Despite the attempts of Diocletian, Constantine I, and Theodosius I, western Rome collapsed and was eventually conquered in 476. The Byzantine empire continued to prosper, however.

Medieval warfare

When stirrups came into use some time during the Dark Ages militaries were forever changed. This invention coupled with technological, cultural, and social developments had forced a dramatic transformation in the character of warfare from antiquity, changing military tactics and the role of cavalry and artillery.

Similar patterns of warfare existed in other parts of the world. In China around the 5th century armies moved from massed infantry to cavalry based forces, copying the steppe nomads. The Middle East and North Africa used similar, if often more advanced, technologies than Europe.

In Japan the Medieval warfare period is considered by many to have stretched into the 19th century. In Africa along the Sahel and Sudan states like the Kingdom of Sennar and Fulani Empire employed Medieval tactics and weapons well after they had been supplanted in Europe.

In the Medieval period, feudalism was firmly implanted, and there existed many landlords in Europe. Landlords often owned castles to protect their territory.

The Islamic Arab Empire began rapidly expanding throughout the Middle East, North Africa, and Central Asia, initially led by Rashidun Caliphate, and later under the Umayyads. While their attempts to invade Europe by way of the Balkans were defeated by Byzantium and Bulgaria, the Arabs expanded to the Iberian Peninsula in the west and the Indus Valley in the east. The Abassids then took over the Arab Empire, though the Umayyads remained in control of Islamic Spain.

At the Battle of Tours, the Franks under Charles Martel stopped short a Muslim invasion. The Abassids defeated the Tang Chinese army at the Battle of Talas, but were later defeated by the Seljuk Turks and the Mongols centuries later, until the Arab Empire eventually came to an end after the Battle of Baghdad in 1258.

In China, the Sui dynasty had risen and conquered the Chen Dynasty of the south. They invaded Vietnam (northern Vietnam had been in Chinese control since the Han dynasty), fighting the troops of Champa, who had cavalry mounted on elephants. After decades of economic turmoil and a failed invasion of Korea, the Sui collapsed and was followed by the Tang dynasty, who fought with various Turkic groups, the Tibetans of Lhasa, the Tanguts, the Khitans, and collapsed due to political fragmentation of powerful regional military governors (jiedushi). The innovative Song dynasty followed next, inventing new weapons of war that employed the use of Greek Fire and gunpowder (see section below) against enemies such as the Jurchens.

The Mongols under Genghis Khan, Ögedei Khan, Möngke Khan, and Kublai Khan conquered most of Eurasia. They took over China, Persia, Turkestan, and Russia. After Kublai Khan took power and created the Yuan dynasty, the divisions of the empire ceased to cooperate with each other, and the Mongol Empire was only nominally united.

In New Zealand, prior to European discovery, oral histories, legends and whakapapa include many stories of battles and wars. Māori warriors were held in high esteem. One group of Polynesians migrated to the Chatham Islands, where they developed the largely pacifist Moriori culture. Their pacifism left the Moriori unable to defend themselves when the islands were invaded by mainland Māori in the 1830s.

They proceeded to massacre the Moriori and enslave the survivors. Warrior culture also developed in the isolated Hawaiian Islands. During the 1780s and 1790s the chiefs and alii were constantly fighting for power. After a series of battles the Hawaiian Islands were united for the first time under a single ruler who would become known as Kamehameha I.

Gunpowder warfare

After gunpowder weapons were first developed in Song dynasty China (see also Technology of Song Dynasty), the technology later spread west to the Ottoman Empire, from where it spread to the Safavid Empire of Persia and the Mughal Empire of India. The arquebus was later adopted by European armies during the Italian Wars of the early 16th century.

This all brought an end to the dominance of armored cavalry on the battlefield. The simultaneous decline of the feudal system – and the absorption of the medieval city-states into larger states – allowed the creation of professional standing armies to replace the feudal levies and mercenaries that had been the standard military component of the Middle Ages.

In Africa, Ahmad ibn Ibrihim al-Ghazi, was the first African commander to use gunpowder on the continent in the Ethiopian–Adal War, that lasted for fourteen years (1529–1543).

The period spanning between the 1648 Peace of Westphalia and the 1789 French Revolution is also known as Kabinettskriege (Princes' warfare) as wars were mainly carried out by imperial or monarchics states, decided by cabinets and limited in scope and in their aims. They also involved quickly shifting alliances, and mainly used mercenaries.

Over the course of the 18th-19th centuries all military arms and services underwent significant developments that included a more mobile field artillery, the transition from use of battalion infantry drill in close order to open order formations and the transfer of emphasis from the use of bayonets to the rifle that replaced the musket, and virtual replacement of all types of cavalry with the universal dragoons, or mounted infantry.

Military Revolution

The Military Revolution is a conceptual schema for explaining the transformation of European military strategy, tactics and technology in the early modern period. The argument is that dramatic advances in technology, government finance, and public administration transformed and modernized European armies, tactics, and logistics. Since warfare was so central to the European state, the transformation had a major impact on modernizing government bureaucracies, taxation, and the national economy. The concept was introduced by Michael Roberts in the 1950s as he focused on Sweden 1560–1660. Roberts emphasized the introduction of muskets that could not be aimed at small targets, but could be very effective when fired in volleys by three ranks of infantry soldiers, with one firing while the other two ranks reloaded. All three ranks march forward to demolish the enemy. The infantry now had the firepower that had been reserved to the artillery, and had mobility that could rapidly advance in the battlefield, which the artillery lacked. The infantry thereby surpassed the artillery in tactical maneuvering on the battlefield. Roberts linked these advances with larger historical consequences, arguing that innovations in tactics, drill and doctrine by the Dutch and Swedes 1560–1660 led to a need for more and better trained troops and thus for permanent forces (standing armies). Armies grew much larger and more expensive. These changes in turn had major political consequences in the level of administrative support and the supply of money, men and provisions, producing new financial demands and the creation of new governmental institutions. "Thus, argued Roberts, the modern art of war made possible—and necessary—the creation of the modern state". In the 1990s the concept was modified and extended by Geoffrey Parker, who argued that developments in fortification and siege warfare caused the revolution. The concept of a military revolution based upon technology has given way to models based more on a slow evolution in which technology plays a minor role to organization, command and control, logistics and in general non-material improvements. The revolutionary nature of these changes was only visible after a long evolution that handed Europe a predominant place in warfare, a place that the industrial revolution would confirm.

The concept of a military revolution in the sixteenth and seventeenth centuries has received a mixed reception among historians. Noted military historians Michael Duffy and Jeremy Black have strongly criticised it as misleading, exaggerated and simplistic.

Industrial warfare

As weapons—particularly small arms—became easier to use, countries began to abandon a complete reliance on professional soldiers in favor of conscription. Technological advances became increasingly important; while the armies of the previous period had usually had similar weapons, the industrial age saw encounters such as the Battle of Sadowa, in which possession of a more advanced technology played a decisive role in the outcome. Conscription was employed in industrial warfare to increase the number of military personnel that were available for combat. Conscription was notably used by Napoleon Bonaparte and the major parties during the two World Wars.

Total war was used in industrial warfare, the objective being to prevent the opposing nation to engage in war. Napoleon was the innovator. William Tecumseh Sherman's "March to the Sea" and Philip Sheridan's burning of the Shenandoah Valley during the American Civil War were examples. On the largest scale the strategic bombing of enemy cities and industrial factories during World War II was total warfare.

Modern warfare

Since the 1940s, preparation for a major war has been based on technological arms races involving all sorts of new weapons systems, such as nuclear and biological, as well as computerized control systems, and the opening of new venues, such as seen in the Space race involving the United States, the Soviet Union, and more recently, China.

Modern war also saw the improvement of armored tank technology. While tanks were present in the First World War, and the Second World War, armored warfare technology came to a head with the start of the Cold War. Many of the technologies commonly seen on main battle tanks today, such as composite armor, high caliber cannons, and advanced targeting systems, would be developed during this time.

A distinctive feature since 1945 is the absence of wars between major powers—indeed the near absence of any traditional wars between established countries. The major exceptions were the Indo-Pakistani War of 1971, the Iran–Iraq War 1980–1988, and the Gulf War of 1990–91. Instead actual fighting has largely been a matter of civil wars and insurgencies. The most recent example of a war between two nation states would be the 2022 Russian invasion of Ukraine.

See also

War Studies
Ancient Greek warfare
Military science
List of military writers
Maritime history
Military globalization
Naval history
Roman warfare
Society for Military History
Military history of ancient Rome
Military history of Africa
Military history of Europe
Military history of Oceania
Military history of North America
Military history of South America
Military history by country
 Journal of Military History, scholarly journal
 War in History, scholarly journal
 War & Society, scholarly journal
History of physical training and fitness

Notes and references

Further reading

 Archer, I. John R. Ferris, Holger H. Herwig, and Timothy H. E. Travers. World History of Warfare (2nd ed. 2008) 638 pp
 Black, Jeremy. Warfare in the Western World, 1775–1882 (2001) 240 pp.
 Black, Jeremy. Warfare in the Western World, 1882–1975 (2002), 256 pp.
 Brownstone, David, and Irene M. Franck. Timelines of War: A Chronology of Warfare from 100,000 BC to the Present (1994)

 Chambers, John Whiteclay, ed. The Oxford Companion to American Military History (2000) online
 Cowley, Robert, and Geoffrey Parker, eds. The Reader's Companion to Military History (2001) excellent coverage by scholars. Complete text online free of 1996 edition
 Dear, I. C. B., and M. R. D. Foot, eds. Oxford Companion to World War II (2005; 2nd ed. 2010) online
 Doughty, Robert, Ira D. Gruber, Roy K. Flint, and Mark Grimsley. Warfare In The Western World (2 vol 1996), comprehensive textbook; online vol 1 to 1871
 Dupuy, R. Ernest and Trevor N. Dupuy. The Encyclopedia of Military History: From 3500 B.C. to the Present (1977), 1465 pp; comprehensive summary focused on wars and battles; online
 Dyer, Gwynne. The Shortest History of War: From Hunter-Gatherers to Nuclear Superpowers—A Retelling for Our Times (2022).
 Grossman, Mark. World military leaders: a biographical dictionary (Infobase Publishing, 2007).
 Holmes, Richard, ed. The Oxford Companion to Military History (2001) 1071 pp; online at OUP
 Jones, Archer, The Art of War in the Western World (2001)

 Kohn, George C. Dictionary of Wars (3rd ed. 2006) 704 pp; very useful summary across world history
 Karsten, Peter. ed., Encyclopedia of War and American Society (3 vols., 2005).
 Keegan, John. The Face of Battle (1976)  excerpt
 Keegan, John. The Price of Admiralty: The Evolution of Naval Warfare (1989)
 Lamphear, John, ed. African Military History (Routledge, 2007).
 Lee, Wayne E. Waging War: Conflict, Culture, and Innovation in World History (2015) excerpt
 Lynn, John A. Battle: A Cultural History of Combat and Culture (2003).

 Muehlbauer, Matthew S., and David J. Ulbrich, eds. The Routledge History of Global War and Society (Routledge, 2018).
 Nolan, Cathal J. The Allure of Battle: A History of How Wars Have Been Won and Lost (2017)
 Nolan, Cathal J. The Age of Wars of Religion, 1000-1650: An Encyclopedia of Global Warfare and Civilization (2 vol 2006)
 Parkinson, Roger. Encyclopedia of modern war (Routledge, 2021); since 1793.
 Roy, Kaushik. A Global History of Pre-Modern Warfare: Before the Rise of the West, 10,000 BCE–1500 CE. (Routledge, 2021).

 Townshend, Charles, ed. The Oxford History of Modern War (2nd ed. 2005)
 Trevor, N  et al. Encyclopedia of military biography (Bloomsbury 2020).
 Tucker, Spencer C., ed.Weapons and Warfare: From Ancient and Medieval Times to the 21st Century (2 vol, ABC-CLIO, 2020).
 Tucker, Spencer C., ed. Middle East Conflicts from Ancient Egypt to the 21st Century: An Encyclopedia and Document Collection (4 vol, ABC-CLIO, 2019).
 Tucker, Spencer. Encyclopedia of American Military History (2019).

Historiography and memory
 Barnett, Correlli, Shelford Bidwell, Brian Bond, and John Terraine. Old Battles and New Defences: Can We Learn from Military History? (1986). online edition
 Black, Jeremy. "Determinisms and Other Issues", Journal of Military History, 68 (Oct. 2004), 1217–32. in Project MUSE
 Black, Jeremy. Rethinking Military History (2004) online edition
 Bucholz, Arden. "Hans Delbruck and Modern Military History." The Historian vol 55#3 (1993) pp. 517+.
 Chambers II, John Whiteclay. "The New Military History: Myth and Reality", Journal of Military History, 55 (July 1991), 395–406
 Chambers, John Whiteclay. "‘All Quiet on the Western Front’ (1930): the antiwar film and the image of the First World War." Historical journal of film, radio and television 14.4 (1994): 377-411.
 Charters, David A., Marc Milner, and J. Brent Wilson. eds. Military History and the Military Profession, (1992)
 Citino, Robert M. "Military Histories Old and New: A Reintroduction", The American Historical Review Vol. 112, no. 4 (October 2007), pp. 1070–90 online version
 Grimsley, Mark. "Why Military History Sucks", Nov. 1996, War Historian.org, online at 
 Higham, John, ed. A Guide to the Sources of British Military History  (2015) 654 pages excerpt
 Hughes, Matthew, and W. Philpott, eds. Palgrave Advances in Modern Military History (2006)  excerpt
 Karsten, Peter. "The 'New' American Military History: A Map of the Territory, Explored and Unexplored", American Quarterly, 36 #3, (1984), 389–418 in JSTOR
 Kimball, Jeffrey. "The Influence of Ideology on Interpretive Disagreement: A Report on a Survey of Diplomatic, Military and Peace Historians on the Causes of 20th Century U. S. Wars," History Teacher 17#3 (1984) pp. 355–384 DOI: 10.2307/493146  online
 Kohn, Richard H. "The Social History of the American Soldier: A Review and Prospectus for Research", American Historical Review, 86 (June 1981), 553–67. in JSTOR
 Lee, Wayne E. "Mind and Matter – Cultural Analysis in American Military History: A Look at the State of the Field", Journal of American History, 93 (March 2007), 1116–42. Fulltext: History Cooperative and Ebsco
 Lynn, John A. "Rally Once Again: The Embattled Future of Academic Military History", Journal of Military History, 61 (Oct. 1997), 777–89.
 Mearsheimer, John J. Liddell Hart and the Weight of History. (1988). 234 pp.
 Messenger, Charles, ed. Reader's Guide to Military History (Routledge, 2001), 948 pp; detailed guide to the historiography of 500 topics excerpt and text search
 Morillo, Stephen. What is Military History (2006)
 Moyar, Mark. "The Current State of Military History", The Historical Journal (2007), 50: 225–40 online at CJO
Muehlbauer, Matthew S., and David J. Ulbrich, eds. The Routledge History of Global War and Society (2018)  
Muehlbauer, Matthew S., and David J. Ulbrich. Ways of War: American Military History from the Colonial Era to the Twenty-First Century (2018)  
 Murray, Williamson and Richard Hart Sinnreich, eds. The Past as Prologue: The Importance of History to the Military Profession (2006).
 Noe, Kenneth W., George C. Rable and Carol Reardon. "Battle Histories: Reflections on Civil War Military Studies" Civil War History 53#3 2007. pp. 229+. online edition
 Porch, Douglas. "Writing History in the 'End of History' Era: Reflections on Historians and the GWOT" Journal of Military History 2006 70(4): 1065–79. on war on terror, 2001–present
 Reardon, Carol. Soldiers and Scholars: The U.S. Army and the Uses of Military History, 1865–1920. U. Press of Kansas 1990. 270 pp. .
 Reid, Brian Holden. "American Military History: the Need for Comparative Analysis." Journal of American History 2007 93(4): 1154–57. 
 Reid, Brian Holden, and Joseph G. Dawson III, eds., "Special Issue: The Vistas of American Military History, 1800–1898", American Nineteenth Century History, 7 (June 2006), 139–321.
 Riseman, Noah. "The Rise of Indigenous Military History." History Compass (2014) 12#12 pp. 901–11. cover 20th century. DOI: 10.1111/hic3.12205.
 Rogers, Clifford J. ed. The Military Revolution Debate: Readings On The Military Transformation Of Early Modern Europe (1995) 
 Sharman, Jason C. "Myths of military revolution: European expansion and Eurocentrism." European Journal of International Relations 24.3 (2018): 491-513 online
 Schleh, Eugene P. "Books About Film and War." Film & History: An Interdisciplinary Journal of Film and Television Studies 8.1 (1978): 11–14.
 Schleh, Eugene P. "All Quiet on the Western Front: A History Teacher's Reappraisal." Film & History 8.4 (1978): 66–69.
 Spector, Ronald H. "Teetering on the Brink of Respectability." Journal of American History 2007 93(4): 1158–60. online
 Spiller, Roger. "Military History and its Fictions." Journal of Military History 2006 70(4): 1081–97. online
 Winter, Jay, and Antoine Prost. The Great War in History Debates and Controversies, 1914 to the Present (Cambridge UP, 2005) excerpt
 Wolters, Timothy S. "Harvey A. DeWeerd and the Dawn of Academic Military History in the United States." Journal of Military History (Jan 2021) 85#1 pp 95–133.

External links

International Bibliography of Military History of the International Commission of Military History – from Brill.nl
H-WAR, daily discussion group for military historians – from Michigan State University Department of History, H-Net Humanities & Social Sciences Online
Web Sources for Military History – from AmericanHistoryProjects.com

 
History
History